"Lookin' out My Back Door" is a song recorded by the American band Creedence Clearwater Revival. Written by the band's lead singer, guitarist, and songwriter, John Fogerty, it is included on their 1970 album Cosmo's Factory; this was the group's fifth album, and was also their fifth and final number-two Billboard hit, held off the top by Diana Ross's version of "Ain't No Mountain High Enough".

Song information
The song's lyrics, filled with colorful, dream-like imagery, lead some to believe that it is about drugs. According to the drug theory, the "flying spoon" was a reference to a cocaine or heroin spoon, and the crazy animal images were an acid trip.  Fogerty, however, has stated in interviews that the song was actually written for his then three-year-old son, Josh.  Fogerty has also said that the allusion to a parade passing by was inspired by the Dr. Seuss book And to Think That I Saw It on Mulberry Street.

The song begins and ends with the mention of Illinois, and locking the front door in a vain attempt to prevent his troubles there from following him home.  Country singer Buck Owens is also mentioned in the song, and the music reflects some of the Bakersfield sound Owens made famous.  Country singer Buddy Alan, the son of Buck Owens, recorded a cover version of the song in 1971.

Reviewing the song, Cash Box stated "emphasing their early-rock gut appeal, CCR plunges into a rough-hewn bit of dance material that should sparkle."

Personnel
 John Fogerty – lead vocals, lead guitar
 Tom Fogerty – rhythm guitar
 Stu Cook – bass guitar, keyboards
 Doug Clifford – drums, percussion

Chart history

Weekly charts

Year-end charts

In popular culture 
The song was featured in The Big Lebowski.

See also
 List of Cash Box Top 100 number-one singles of 1970

References

External links
 Lyrics of this song

Creedence Clearwater Revival songs
1970 songs
1970 singles
Cashbox number-one singles
Number-one singles in Australia
RPM Top Singles number-one singles
Number-one singles in Norway
Songs written by John Fogerty
Song recordings produced by John Fogerty
Fantasy Records singles
Songs about Illinois